Ligueil is a commune in the Indre-et-Loire department in central France.

Geography
Ligueil is close to the former border of Vichy France.

Population

International relations

Ligueil is twinned with:
 Hungerford, United Kingdom

See also
Communes of the Indre-et-Loire department

References

Communes of Indre-et-Loire
Touraine